To The Goddess Electricity was Rational Youth's 1999 comeback album.

Track listing

To The Goddess Electricity was reissued in 2014 in a heavily revised version.  The track order was changed, several selections appeared in substantially different mixes and arrangements (marked †), and two bonus tracks were added (marked ‡).

Personnel
 Tracy Howe – vocals, synthesizers
 Jean-Claude Cutz – synthesizers
 Dave Rout – synthesizers
 Annabella – backing vocals
 Trish Fitzpatrick – backing vocals

Rational Youth albums
1999 albums